A bollard is a sturdy, short, vertical post. The term originally referred to a post on a ship or quay used principally for mooring boats. It now also refers to posts installed to control road traffic and posts designed to prevent automotive vehicles from colliding or crashing into pedestrians and structures, whether intentional from ram-raids and vehicle-ramming attacks, or unintentional losses of control.

Etymology
The term is probably related to bole, meaning a tree trunk. The earliest citation given by the Oxford English Dictionary (referring to a maritime bollard) dates from 1844, although a reference in the Caledonian Mercury in 1817 describes bollards as huge posts.

History

Wooden posts were used for basic traffic management from at least the beginning of the 18th century. An early well-documented case is that of the "two oak-posts" set up next to the medieval Eleanor cross at Waltham Cross, Hertfordshire, in 1721, at the expense of the Society of Antiquaries of London, "to secure Waltham Cross from injury by Carriages".

Types

Maritime

In the maritime contexts in which the term originates, a bollard is either a wooden or iron post found as a deck-fitting on a ship or boat, and used to secure ropes for towing, mooring and other purposes; or its counterpart on land, a short wooden, iron, or stone post on a quayside to which craft can be moored. The Sailor's Word-Book of 1867 defines a bollard in a more specific context as "a thick piece of wood on the head of a whale-boat, round which the harpooner gives the line a turn, in order to veer it steadily, and check the animal's velocity". Bollards on ships, when arranged in pairs, may also be referred to as "bitts".

Road traffic

Roadside bollards 

Bollards can be used either to control traffic intake size by limiting movements, or to control traffic speed by narrowing the available space. Israel's Transportation Research Institute found that putting bollards at highway exits to control traffic also reduced accidents.

Permanent bollards can be used for traffic-control or guarding against vehicle-ramming attacks. They may be mounted near enough to each other that they block ordinary cars/trucks, for instance, but spaced widely enough to permit special-purpose vehicles, bicycles, and pedestrians to pass through. Bollards may also be used to enclose car-free zones. Bollards and other street furniture can also be used to control overspill parking onto sidewalks and verges.

Traffic-island bollards 

Traffic bollards are used to highlight traffic islands. They are primarily used at intersections within the splitter islands (a raised or painted area on the approach of a roundabout used to separate entering from exiting traffic, deflect and slow entering traffic, and provide a stopping place for pedestrians crossing the road in two stages). 

Illuminated bollards are also used to supplement street signs and street lighting to provide a visual cue to approaching drivers that an obstacle exists ahead during hours of darkness and during periods of low visibility:

Internally illuminated traffic bollards have been in existence throughout the United Kingdom and Ireland since the 1930s, although the term "bollard" only seems to have been in common use since the late 1940s. An illuminated bollard has a recessed base light unit in the foundation to illuminate the traffic bollard from all angles. The main components are housed below the road or pedestrian surface (typically a concrete surface). Therefore, if a vehicle strikes the traffic bollard, the units below the surface are not damaged. In addition, most new modern traffic bollards installed along UK roadways today are made of materials that make them completely collapsible. When struck by a vehicle at low or high speed, the traffic bollard shell reverts to its original position with minimal to no damage to the unit.

Reflective bollards may also be used; they need no power or maintenance, and can be built to recover to their normal position after being struck.

Bell 

A bell bollard is a style of bollard designed to deflect vehicle tires. The wheel mounts the lower part of the bollard and is deflected by its increasing slope. Such bollards are effective against heavy goods vehicles that may damage or destroy conventional bollards or other types of street furniture.

Retractable 
Manually retractable bollards (lowered by a key mechanism) are found useful in some cases because they require less infrastructure.

The term "robotic bollards" has been applied to traffic barricades capable of moving themselves into position on a roadway.

Self-righting or self-recovering bollards can take a nudge from a vehicle and return to the upright position without causing damage to the bollard or vehicle. They are popular in car park buildings and other areas of high vehicle usage.

Flexible 
Flexible bollards are bollards designed to bend when struck by vehicles. They are typically made from synthetic plastic or rubber that is stiff on its own, but pliable under the weight of a car or truck. When struck, flexible bollards give way to some extent, reducing damage to vehicles and surrounding surfaces, and return to their original, upright position. Some flexible bollards do not provide physical protection from vehicles; rather they offer clear visual guidance for drivers. Other flexible bollards have been designed to provide physical protection as well as reduced damage by incorporating strong elastic materials. These can be all plastic or plastic/steel hybrids but combine varying degrees of stopping power and flexibility.

Protective 

Bollards are used by government agencies and private businesses to protect buildings, public spaces, and the people in them from car ramming attacks. 

These bollards protect utilities, electronics, machinery, buildings, or pedestrians from accidental or intentional collisions with vehicles. As collisions also cause damage to vehicles, operators, or the bollards themselves, new bollards have been developed that absorb some of the impact energy, lessening the violence of the collision. Some are made of forgiving plastics while others are made of steel but fitted with an elastomer to absorb the impact energy.

Bollards are widely used to contribute to safety and security. The American Bar Association (ABA) states that bollards are used to contribute to homeland security. The American National Institute of Building Sciences site—the Whole Building Design Guide (WBDG)—recommends in its Design Guidance that open spaces surrounding and contiguous to buildings be included as integral parts of a security design.

There are two main kinds of security-related bollard:

 Non-crash-resistant bollards.
 Crash- and attack-resistant bollards used to protect places at risk of being attacked. 

According to the National Institute of Building Sciences, non-crash-resistant bollards are "perceived impediments to access" and address the actions of two groups:

 Law-abiding persons who comply with civil prescriptions of behavior as defined by the manner in which bollards are put to use;
 Potentially threatening and disruptive persons for whom bollard applications are proscriptive by announcing their behavior is anticipated, and that additional levels of security await them.

High security bollards are impact-tested in accordance with one or more of three major crash test ratings for vehicle barriers. These are PAS 68 (UK), IWA-14 (International) and ASTM (US). 

Bollard sleeves in various alloys or finishes are designed to cover security bollards to enhance their visual attractiveness.

U-shaped bollards are typically used for the protection of equipment and are common in areas that need coverage over a wider area than of a normal bollard, such as fuel stations and bike lanes.

Parking bollards 
Bollards have become common use for reserving parking spots from unauthorized vehicles. Parking bollards are typically situated in the centre of a parking bay as a physical obstruction. They then fold either manually or automatically to admit authorized users. These bollards are often used in smaller parking lots such as visitor parking or corporate parking lots, as an alternative to boom gates.  They can be powered by a wide variety of means, with the most common being battery-powered or electric-powered.

Other applications 
The National Clearinghouse for Educational Facilities (NCEF), managed by the National Institute of Building Sciences (NIBS), cited three dozen applications of bollards.

US fire regulations 
According to the International Fire Code (IFC-2009) and the American National Fire Protection Association Fire Code 1 (NFPA-1) all new buildings or renovated buildings must have fire access roadways to accommodate fire apparatus and crews and other first responders. Thus the choice of bollard styles must apply to the NFPA's Code 1710. Bollards are now designed in terms of how long it takes to remove or collapse them to allow first responders entry to the access roadway.

Artwork

In Geelong, Victoria, Australia, decorative bollards, sculpted and painted by Jan Mitchell, are placed around the city to enhance the landscape as a form of outdoor public sculpture. Usually they are made of timber, minimally modified from the traditionally cylindrical, wooden, maritime bollard shape, but brightly painted to resemble human figures. Such figures – which may be historical or contemporary, particular or generic – are sited singly or in clusters along the waterfront and in other areas where people gather. Decorative bollards have become a well-known feature of the city of Geelong and reflect its history as a major Australian port.

In Antwerp, Belgium, artist Eddy Gabriel transformed a bollard to look like a toadstool in 1993. This example was followed by other artists, turning the quayside of the river Scheldt into a street art gallery.

In Norwich, England, a set of 21 bollards was installed in 2008 in the Lanes area north of City Hall, designed by artist Oliver Creed and commissioned by the City Council as part of a regeneration programme. They are coloured "madder red", in reference to the red dye extracted from the madder plant and used for dying cloth, one of the city's major industries during the 16th century; and they bear bronze finials also alluding to local history. 10 of these depict the madder plant, while the other 11 have unique designs, usually relevant to the specific location in which the bollard is placed, including a scene of sheep-shearing, a Green Man, a swan's head in Swan Lane, and so on.

On the forecourt of Cambridge University Library, England, a line of 14 bronze bollards made to resemble piles of books was installed in 2009. This work, Ex Libris, was created by sculptor Harry Gray. The ten outer bollards are static, but the "books" making up the four central bollards can be swivelled, so that the lettering on their spines aligns to form the Latin phrase Ex Libris ("from/out of the books"), commonly used on bookplates.

Gallery

See also 

 Amsterdammertje
 Automatic number-plate recognition
 Coal-tax post
 Guard rail
 Guard stone
 Highway marker
 Jersey barrier
 Milestone
 Stanchion
 Sump buster
 Traffic barrier
 Traffic cone

References

External links 

 

Road infrastructure
Road safety
Street furniture
Streetworks
Traffic signs